Walter Folger Jr. (June 12, 1765 – September 8, 1849) was a U.S. Representative from Massachusetts.

Biography
Born in Nantucket in the Province of Massachusetts Bay, Folger was a member of a large family that included his sister, diarist Phebe Folger Coleman. Notably he was the great-great-great grandson of Peter Folger and Mary Morrell Folger and first cousin three times removed of Benjamin Franklin. Through his mother he is also a member or the Starbuck whaling family of Nantucket.

He attended public schools before studying law. He was admitted to the bar and practiced before serving as member of the Massachusetts State Senate. Folger was elected as a Democratic-Republican to the Fifteenth Congress and reelected to the Sixteenth Congress (March 4, 1817 – March 3, 1821).  He resumed the practice of law, and died in Nantucket on September 8, 1849.  He was interred in Friends Burying Ground.

References

1765 births
1849 deaths
Massachusetts state senators
Massachusetts lawyers
People from Nantucket, Massachusetts
Democratic-Republican Party members of the United States House of Representatives from Massachusetts
19th-century American lawyers